Ferdinand Tille (born 8 December 1988) is a German volleyball player, a member of Germany men's national volleyball team and German club WWK Volleys Herrsching, a gold medalist of European League 2009, a bronze medalist of the World Championship 2014.

Career

Clubs
On May 27, 2014, it was announced that Tille was a new player of Polish club PGE Skra Bełchatów. On October 8, 2014 his team won ENEA Polish SuperCup 2014. On May 6, 2015 he won with PGE Skra Bełchatów the bronze medal of the Polish Championship. In May 2015 he signed a contract with WWK Volleys Herrsching.

Sporting achievements

Clubs

National championships
 2007/2008  German Championship, with Generali Unterhaching
 2008/2009  German Cup, with Generali Unterhaching
 2008/2009  German Championship, with Generali Unterhaching
 2009/2010  German Cup, with Generali Unterhaching
 2009/2010  German Championship, with Generali Unterhaching
 2010/2011  German Cup, with Generali Unterhaching
 2011/2012  French Championship, with Arago de Sète
 2012/2013  French Championship, with Arago de Sète
 2014/2015  Polish SuperCup2014, with PGE Skra Bełchatów
 2014/2015  Polish Championship, with PGE Skra Bełchatów

National team
 2009  European League
 2014  FIVB World Championship
 2015  European Games

Individual
 2010 FIVB World Championship - Best Libero

References

External links

 Ferdinand Tille at the International Volleyball Federation
 
 
 Player profile at Volleybox.net

1988 births
Living people
People from Mühldorf
Sportspeople from Upper Bavaria
German men's volleyball players
German expatriate sportspeople in Poland
Expatriate volleyball players in Poland
Skra Bełchatów players
European Games medalists in volleyball
European Games gold medalists for Germany
Volleyball players at the 2015 European Games
German expatriate sportspeople in France
Expatriate volleyball players in France